Toutang Station is an interchange station between Line 4 and Line 9 of Chongqing Rail Transit in Chongqing municipality, China. It is located in Jiangbei District, adjacent to the People's Government of Chongqing, Jiangbei District. It opened in 2018.

Station structure

References

Railway stations in Chongqing
Railway stations in China opened in 2018
Chongqing Rail Transit stations